Joseph Katz may refer to:

 Joseph Katz (Soviet agent) (1912–2004), worked for Soviet intelligence from the 1930s to the late 1940s
 Joseph Katz (professor), Israel-born American fluid dynamicist
 Joseph J. Katz (1912–2008), chemist at Argonne National Laboratory
 Joseph M. Katz (1913–1991), entrepreneur who founded a gift-wrap manufacturing company

See also
 Josef Kates (1921–2018), born Josef Katz, Canadian engineer
 Joseph M. Katz Graduate School of Business